The Warren and Jamestown Street Railway operated a 22-mile line between Jamestown, NY, Warren, PA, and Sheffield, PA. The company was incorporated January 15, 1904 from the consolidation of the Warren and Jamestown Electric Railroad (chartered in 1902) and the Warren and Jamestown Street Railway of Pennsylvania. Operations began September 1, 1905. Operations ceased between Warren and Sheffield on April 1, 1928, and between Warren and Jamestown December 2, 1929.

Route
In Warren, the line connected with the Warren Street Railway and extended south to Sheffield. The two companies were allied and shared repair shops in Warren. The line was very steep with a number of 5% grades, including one a mile long. Despite the grades, the line had an average operating speed of 50 MPH.

Facilities
The powerhouse was in Stoneham PA, five miles south of Warren, where horizontal gas engines using natural gas produced power cheaply. Initially power was a single phase 3300 volt alternating current except for in the terminal cities where it was converted to 550 volts. This arrangement lasted until 1911 when the line was converted to the standard 600 volt direct current.

Rolling stock
Initial rolling stock was a number of St. Louis built heavyweight wooden cars. In 1907 the company purchased Express car #50 and car #52. In 1916 a steel "stepless" car center-entrance interurban car was purchased from Kuhlman. This car was 48'11" long, 8'6" wide, 12'2" high, seated 47, had Brill 27MCB2x trucks with a 75" wheelbase and 33" wheels. The car had 4 fifty HP motors, K35 control, and was capable of double-end operation. A later order from Kuhlman included two lightweight combination baggage passenger low floor cars of a conventional floor plan.

External links
 Western New York Railroad Archive

References
  Reifschneider, Felix E. 1949. Interurbans of the Empire State
 Woodbury, John. 1958. Unpublished notes.

Defunct New York (state) railroads
Defunct Pennsylvania railroads
Interurban railways in New York (state)
Interurban railways in Pennsylvania